"Enter 77" is the 11th episode of the third season of Lost, and the 60th episode overall. It was aired on March 7, 2007. The episode was written by Damon Lindelof and Carlton Cuse and directed by Stephen Williams. The character of Sayid Jarrah (Naveen Andrews) is featured in the episode's flashbacks.

Plot

Flashbacks
In his flashback, Sayid is a chef in a restaurant in Paris. He is summoned onto the portico by an Iraqi named Sami (Shaun Toub), who compliments the meal Sayid cooked for him, and offers him a job as a chef in his new restaurant. Sayid later arrives at the restaurant, and meets Sami's wife, Amira (Anne Bedian). She has burn scars on her arm, but their introduction is cut short when the woman confirms that Sayid is "him". Sayid is suddenly attacked and knocked unconscious. He is chained up in the basement of the restaurant. Sami explains that his wife was tortured by the Republican Guard, and she recognized her torturer to be Sayid. Sayid denies this passionately. Sami's wife is brought before Sayid as Sami begins to brutally beat him, trying to get him to admit that he tortured his wife. Sami reaches for an iron bar, but his wife stops him. The following day, Sayid is visited by Amira. She explains that she rescued a cat from torture by street kids (which bears a striking resemblance to the cat at the Flame station), and while it sleeps with her and loves her, it also sometimes attacks her, because it sometimes forgets that it is safe. She forgives him for this, because she also knows what it is like to never be safe, because of Sayid. Sayid admits that he remembers her, that her face has haunted him since he left Iraq. He breaks down in tears and emotionally apologizes, over and over. Amira forgives him. Moreover, she says she will tell Sami that she has made a terrible mistake, that they have found the wrong person, so that Sami will let him go.

At the Flame Station
In the jungle, John Locke (Terry O'Quinn), Sayid, Kate Austen (Evangeline Lilly) and Danielle Rousseau (Mira Furlan) stumble across a farmhouse with a satellite dish on its roof. Its inhabitant (Andrew Divoff) is revealed to be the mysterious one-eyed man whom Sayid, Locke and company saw on The Pearl's monitoring video in an earlier episode. Rousseau decides not to get involved, so she leaves as the rest of the group proceeds to the farmhouse. Sayid approaches unarmed (noticing a mysterious cat whose name is later revealed to be Nadia after Nadia Comăneci), but as he nears, the one-eyed man appears with a Mosin–Nagant rifle in his hands. He shoots Sayid in the shoulder, screaming that he didn't cross the line, and that they had a truce. After Sayid tells him about the plane crash, the one-eyed man emerges. Kate and Locke rush out from hiding to disarm him. The one-eyed man reveals his name to be Mikhail Bakunin (the same first and last name as the famous Russian anarchist), and claims that he is the last living member of the DHARMA Initiative.

While treating Sayid's gunshot wound, Mikhail tells the survivors about how he came to the island, after responding to a newspaper advertisement for the DHARMA Initiative. He has been on the island for eleven years, staying in the station called The Flame, where he communicates with the outside world. Mikhail tells Sayid that several years ago, the DHARMA Initiative launched a purge against "the hostiles," but Mikhail did not participate in it. As a result, the hostiles let him live, provided he did not cross the line around his house. He also states that the dish on the roof has not worked for years, and that the hostiles were on the island long before the DHARMA Initiative. Meanwhile, Locke finds a computer running a chess program. He plays and begins a losing streak. Sayid realizes Mikhail is an Other, not a member of the DHARMA Initiative, and almost certainly is not alone.

Mikhail explains that the station is connected to an underwater beacon to guide submarines to the island. When Sayid taunts Mikhail about killing one of the hostiles, Mikhail attacks him and Kate, but is overpowered. They tie him up. Sayid reveals a hatch hidden under a rug. Kate and Sayid descend into the hatch while Locke keeps watch over the unconscious Mikhail. The basement is wired with explosives. Sayid finds several DHARMA manuals. Upstairs, Locke is distracted by the prompting of the chess game. He finally manages to beat the chess computer, after which the screen changes to a video of "Dr. Marvin Candle" / "Dr. Mark Wickmund", which tells him to enter number codes for communication. Since the satellite and sonar have been rendered inoperable, Dr. Candle says, "Has there been an incursion of the station by the hostiles? If so, enter 7-7." Locke is about to enter the code when Mikhail appears behind him and holds a knife before his throat. In the basement, Kate is attacked by Bea Klugh (April Grace), but Sayid comes to her defense. Kate retaliates, punching Klugh in the face after recognizing her as one of the Others from the Pala Ferry dock when they were kidnapped, and tells Sayid that she will know where Jack is. They take her upstairs. Locke is outside, being held at gunpoint by Mikhail. There is a lot of arguing in Russian between Klugh and Mikhail, and then Mikhail shoots Klugh. Locke struggles for the gun, and Sayid manages to knock Mikhail to the ground. Mikhail begs to be killed, but Sayid lets him live.

Locke watches Dr. Candle's video again, pausing at the "Enter 7-7" part. Sayid shows Mikhail a map that shows a cable running from The Flame to a place called "The Barracks." Mikhail doesn't tell him about this place on the map, but warns that the moment Sayid's guard is down, he will attack. Danielle agrees with this. "You have a map," she says, "Why keep him alive?" Sayid refuses to kill him. Locke emerges and says that he beat the chess game and found out why Mikhail hadn't wanted him to beat it. The farmhouse blows up. Once again, one of Sayid's hopes of being able to communicate with the outside world has been taken away by Locke. As the group turns to leave, Sayid catches sight of the cat.

On the beach
The episode starts off with James "Sawyer" Ford (Josh Holloway) noticing Paulo (Rodrigo Santoro) with one of his magazines; he explains that "they share things now." After seeing that the castaways have set up a ping-pong table, Sawyer decides to challenge someone to a game to retrieve his "stash". Sun-Hwa Kwon (Yunjin Kim) decides that if he loses, he has to give up using colorful nicknames for a week.

The ping-pong match begins between Hugo "Hurley" Reyes (Jorge Garcia) and Sawyer. Sawyer loses badly, but Hurley takes pity on him and returns some of his magazines. At this point, Hurley reassures Sawyer that Kate will be safe while with Sayid and Locke.

Reception
12.45 million American viewers watched this episode live.

Awards
Naveen Andrews submitted this episode for consideration for Outstanding Supporting Actor in a Drama Series at the 59th Primetime Emmy Awards.

References

External links

"Enter 77" at ABC

Lost (season 3) episodes
2007 American television episodes
Fiction about animal cruelty
Television episodes written by Damon Lindelof